Livo  may refer to:

Places
Italy
Livo, Lombardy, a comune in the Province of Como
The Livo, a river in that comune
Livo, Trentino, a comune in the Province of Trento

Animal breeds 
The Lariana or Capra di Livo, a breed of domestic goat from the Province of Como
The Livo, a sheep breed from the Val di Livo

See also
Livø